Nehvizdy is a market town in Prague-East District in the Central Bohemian Region of the Czech Republic. Is has about 3,800 inhabitants.

Administrative parts
The village of Nehvízdky is an administrative part of Nehvizdy.

Geography
It lies in a flat agricultural landscape of the Central Elbe Table.

History

The first written mention of Nehvizdy (regarding local parish) is from 1352.

On 29 December 1941, Czechoslovak paratroopers Gabčík and Kubiš sent by the Czech government-in-exile in London to assassinate Reinhard Heydrich were inserted near Nehvizdy (they overflew their predesignated target area near Plzeň by more than a hundred kilometres due to a navigational error). The soldiers hid themselves in a nearby abandoned quarry and with the help of several local citizens were able to relink with collaborators and later fulfill the mission.

Demographics
In time of the 2011 census, the population was 2,166, almost exclusively of Czechs ethnicity. 14% of population were believers, mostly identified to Roman Catholic Church. While the population was quite steady in the 20th century, the town has experienced significant growth since 2001, especially due to proximity and good accessibility of the capital city.

Transport
Nehvizdy lies on road connecting Prague with Poděbrady and Hradec Králové. Nowadays the D11 motorway runs just south of the market town parallel to the old road.

Sights
The landmark of Nehvizdy is the Gothic Church of Saint Wenceslaus. It was built in the late 13th century and first mentioned in 1361. The adjacent bell tower is from the 16th century.

A small monument in the centre of Nehvizdy commemorates the Operation Anthropoid event. It is formed in the shape of a parachute and it was created in 2021.

Gallery

References

External links

Market towns in the Czech Republic
Populated places in Prague-East District